Bhalswa Jahangir Pur is a census town in North West district in the state of Delhi, India, it is situated next to Bhalswa horseshoe lake.

Demographics
The provisional figures for the 2001 Census of India recorded  Bhalswa Jahangir Pur having a POPULATION of 151,427. Males constituted 55% of the population and females 45%. The average literacy rate was 59%, lower than the national average of 59.5%; with 62% of the males and 38% of the females literate. 17% of the population was under 6 years of age.,

References

Cities and towns in North West Delhi district